Of the brigades listed below, only Philips' and Benteen's brigades, and a small part of Sanborn's brigade from the Union Army of the Border fought in the Battle of Mine Creek of the American Civil War. The Confederate order of battle is listed separately.  The entire organization of the Army of the Border is shown.

Command disputes 

By order of MG James G. Blunt (General Field Orders No. 2) the militia regiments of William H. M. Fishbeck, Brigadier General of Militia, were placed under the command of Charles W. Blair, Colonel of Volunteers; Fishbeck was infuriated that his command had been subordinated to a volunteer officer.  Because Kansas law stated that militia should be kept under the command of militia officers, Fishbeck disregarded Blunt's order.  Blunt had Fishbeck arrested and held until released by order of MG Samuel Curtis.  Upon his release, Fishbeck resumed command of the Kansas Militia regiments, with orders to obey directives that came from MG Blunt.  This rather cumbersome arrangement had BG Fishbeck in direct command of the militia units attached to the 3rd Brigade, 1st Division, and Col Charles Blair in overall command of the brigade.  Howard N. Monnett describes the arrangement as a "brigade within a brigade".  Blair and Fishbeck led the militia into action at Westport (accompanied onto the field by MG George W. Dietzler), and then in the subsequent pursuit of Price until MG Curtis ordered the militia to return home.

Abbreviations used

Military rank 
 MG = Major General
 BG = Brigadier General
 Col = Colonel
 Ltc = Lieutenant Colonel
 Maj = Major
 Cpt = Captain
 Lt = 1st Lieutenant
 2Lt = 2nd Lieutenant

Army of the Border 
MG Samuel Ryan Curtis

Escort:
 2nd Kansas Cavalry (battalion): Maj Henry Hopkins
 Company G, 11th Kansas Cavalry: Cpt C. L. Gove
 Company H, 15th Kansas Cavalry
 Mountain howitzer battery: Lt Edward Gill

Notes
The list shown is the entire Army of the Border.  Of this army, only Philip's and Benteen's Brigades were present at this battle.  Other brigades from this army fought other battles during Price's Raid.

References
 Buresh, Lumir F. October 25 and the Battle of Mine Creek (Kansas City, MO:  The Lowell Press), 1977.  
 Monnett, Howard N. Action Before Westport: 1864 (Niwot, CO:  University Press of Colorado), 1995. [revised edition]
 Hinton, Richard Josiah.  Rebel invasion of Missouri and Kansas, and the campaign of the army of the border against General Sterling Price, in October and November, 1864 (Chicago: Church and Goodman)

External links
 Artist Rendition of Battle
 Mine Creek Battlefield State Historic Site
 Sanborn, General John B.; The Campaign in Missouri in September and October 1864

American Civil War orders of battle